Juan y Eva is a 2011 Argentine movie based on the Argentine president Juan Perón and his wife Eva Perón. It features Osmar Nuñez as Juan Perón and Julieta Díaz as Eva Perón. The film was directed by Paula de Luque. The film controversially received government subsidies for over $3 million, was about the founders of the Justicialist Party which supported Cristina Kirchner's presidential bid, and received wide release, including in most state run cinemas, a month before the 2011 Argentinean presidential election. De Luque subsequently went on to direct "Néstor Kirchner: La película", a documentary of the life of the husband of then president Cristina Fernández, which was widely seen as a propaganda film and also received state subsidies.

Plot
The story is based on the first meeting of Juan Perón and Eva Perón, during a fundraising for the recent 1944 San Juan earthquake, and their growing relation. The plot avoids the controversial political topics related to peronism, and focused instead in a romantic plot.

Cast
 Osmar Núñez as Juan Perón
 Julieta Díaz as Eva Perón
 Alberto Ajaka as Juan Duarte
 Pompeyo Audivert as Edelmiro Farrell
 Sergio Boris as Domingo Mercante
 María Laura Cali as María Aurelia Tizón
 Alfredo Casero as Spruille Braden

Reception
The Argentine president Cristina Fernández de Kirchner promoted the movie during a speech in Merlo.

See also
 Cultural depictions of Eva Perón

References

External links
 

Cultural depictions of Eva Perón
Argentine drama films
2010s Spanish-language films
Films set in the 1940s
Films set in the 1950s
Argentine films based on actual events
2011 films
2010s Argentine films